This is a list of the main career statistics of professional tennis player Venus Williams.

Performance timelines

Singles
Current through the 2023 ASB Classic.
<div style="overflow-x: auto">
{|class="wikitable nowrap" style=text-align:center;font-size:97%
!Tournament!!1994!!1995!!1996!!1997!!1998!!1999!!2000!!2001!!2002!!2003!!2004!!2005!!2006!!2007!!2008!!2009!!2010!!2011!!2012!!2013!!2014!!2015!!2016!!2017!!2018!!2019!!2020!!2021!!2022!!2023!!SR!!W–L!!Win%
|-
|colspan=33 align=left|Grand Slam tournaments
|-
|align=left|Australian Open
|A
|A
|A
|A
|bgcolor=ffebcd|QF
|bgcolor=ffebcd|QF
|A
|bgcolor=yellow|SF
|bgcolor=ffebcd|QF
|bgcolor=thistle|F
|bgcolor=afeeee|3R
|bgcolor=afeeee|4R
|bgcolor=afeeee|1R
|A
|bgcolor=ffebcd|QF
|bgcolor=afeeee|2R
|bgcolor=ffebcd|QF
|bgcolor=afeeee|3R
|A
|bgcolor=afeeee|3R
|bgcolor=afeeee|1R
|bgcolor=ffebcd|QF
|bgcolor=afeeee|1R
|bgcolor=thistle|F
|bgcolor=afeeee|1R
|bgcolor=afeeee|3R
|bgcolor=afeeee|1R
|bgcolor=afeeee|2R
|A
|A
|0 / 21
|54–21
|72%
|-
|align=left|French Open
|A
|A
|A
|bgcolor=afeeee|2R
|bgcolor=ffebcd|QF
|bgcolor=afeeee|4R
|bgcolor=ffebcd|QF
|bgcolor=afeeee|1R
|bgcolor=thistle|F
|bgcolor=afeeee|4R
|bgcolor=ffebcd|QF
|bgcolor=afeeee|3R
|bgcolor=ffebcd|QF
|bgcolor=afeeee|3R
|bgcolor=afeeee|3R
|bgcolor=afeeee|3R
|bgcolor=afeeee|4R
|A
|bgcolor=afeeee|2R
|bgcolor=afeeee|1R
|bgcolor=afeeee|2R
|bgcolor=afeeee|1R
|bgcolor=afeeee|4R
|bgcolor=afeeee|4R
|bgcolor=afeeee|1R
|bgcolor=afeeee|1R
|bgcolor=afeeee|1R
|bgcolor=afeeee|1R
|A
|
|0 / 24
|48–24
|67%
|-
|align=left|Wimbledon
|A
|A
|A
|bgcolor=afeeee|1R
|bgcolor=ffebcd|QF
|bgcolor=ffebcd|QF
|bgcolor=lime|W
|bgcolor=lime|W
|bgcolor=thistle|F
|bgcolor=thistle|F
|bgcolor=afeeee|2R
|bgcolor=lime|W
|bgcolor=afeeee|3R
|bgcolor=lime|W
|bgcolor=lime|W
|bgcolor=thistle|F
|bgcolor=ffebcd|QF
|bgcolor=afeeee|4R
|bgcolor=afeeee|1R
|A
|bgcolor=afeeee|3R
|bgcolor=afeeee|4R
|bgcolor=yellow|SF
|bgcolor=thistle|F
|bgcolor=afeeee|3R
|bgcolor=afeeee|1R
|style=color:#767676|NH
|bgcolor=afeeee|2R
|A
|
|5 / 23
|90–18
|83%
|-
|align=left|US Open
|A
|A
|A
|bgcolor=thistle|F
|bgcolor=yellow|SF
|bgcolor=yellow|SF
|bgcolor=lime|W
|bgcolor=lime|W
|bgcolor=thistle|F
|A
|bgcolor=afeeee|4R
|bgcolor=ffebcd|QF
|A
|bgcolor=yellow|SF
|bgcolor=ffebcd|QF
|bgcolor=afeeee|4R
|bgcolor=yellow|SF
|bgcolor=afeeee|2R
|bgcolor=afeeee|2R
|bgcolor=afeeee|2R
|bgcolor=afeeee|3R
|bgcolor=ffebcd|QF
|bgcolor=afeeee|4R
|bgcolor=yellow|SF
|bgcolor=afeeee|3R
|bgcolor=afeeee|2R
|bgcolor=afeeee|1R
|A
|bgcolor=afeeee|1R
|
|2 / 23
|79–20
|81%
|-style=font-weight:bold;background:#efefef
|style=text-align:left|Win–loss
|0–0
|0–0
|0–0
|7–3
|17–4
|15–4
|18–1
|19–2
|22–4
|15–3
|10–4
|16–3
|6–3
|14–2
|17–3
|12–4
|16–4
|6–2
|2–3
|3–3
|5–4
|11–4
|11–4
|20–4
|4–4
|3–4
|0–3
|2–3
|0–1
|0–0
|7 / 91
|271–83
|77%
|-
|colspan=33 align=left|Year-end championship
|-
|align=left|WTA Finals
|colspan=4|did not qualify
|A
|bgcolor=yellow|SF
|A
|A
|bgcolor=yellow|SF
|A
|Alt
|Alt
|DNQ
|A
|bgcolor=lime|W
|bgcolor=thistle|F
|A
|colspan=4 |did not qualify
|Alt
|DNQ
|bgcolor=thistle|F
|colspan=2|DNQ
|style=color:#767676|NH
|colspan=2|DNQ
|
|1 / 5
|14–7
|67%
|-
|align=left|WTA Elite Trophy
|colspan=15 style=color:#767676|not held
|colspan=3 |did not qualify
|A
|colspan=2 |DNQ
|bgcolor=lime|W
|A
|colspan=3|did not qualify
|colspan=4 style=color:#767676|not held
|1 / 1
|4–0
|100%
|-
|align=left|Grand Slam Cup
|colspan=4 style=color:#767676|men's only event
|bgcolor=lime|W
|bgcolor=thistle|F
|colspan=24 style=color:#767676|not held
|1 / 2
|5–1
|83%
|-
| colspan="33" align="left" |National representation
|-
|align=left|Olympics
|colspan=2 style=color:#767676|not held
|A
|colspan=3 style=color:#767676|not held
|bgcolor=gold|G
|colspan=3 style=color:#767676|not held
|bgcolor=afeeee|3R
|colspan=3 style=color:#767676|not held
|bgcolor=ffebcd|QF
|colspan=3 style=color:#767676|not held
|bgcolor=afeeee|3R
|colspan=3 style=color:#767676|not held
|bgcolor=afeeee|1R
|colspan=4 style=color:#767676|not held
|A
|colspan=2 style=color:#767676|not held
|1 / 5
|13–4
|76%
|-
|align=left|Fed Cup
|A
|A
|A
|A
|A
|bgcolor=lime|W
|A
|A
|A
|bgcolor=thistle|F
|bgcolor=ffebcd|QF
|bgcolor=yellow|SF
|A
|bgcolor=yellow|SF
|A
|A
|A
|A
|A
|bgcolor=ecf2ff|PO
|A
|bgcolor=ecf2ff|PO
|bgcolor=ecf2ff|PO
|A
|bgcolor=thistle|F
|A
|A
|A
|A
|
|1 / 6
|21–2
|91%
|-
|colspan=33 align=left|WTA Premier Mandatory / WTA 1000 tournaments
|-
|align=left|Indian Wells Open
|colspan=2 style=color:#767676|Tier II
|bgcolor=afeeee|1R
|bgcolor=ffebcd|QF
|bgcolor=yellow|SF
|A
|A
|bgcolor=yellow|SF
|colspan=14|A
|bgcolor=afeeee|2R
|bgcolor=ffebcd|QF
|bgcolor=yellow|SF
|bgcolor=ffebcd|QF
|style=color:#767676|NH
|A
|A
|
|0 / 8
|21–7
|75%
|-
|align=left|Miami Open
|A
|A
|A
|bgcolor=afeeee|3R
|bgcolor=lime|W
|bgcolor=lime|W
|A
|bgcolor=lime|W
|bgcolor=yellow|SF
|bgcolor=afeeee|4R
|bgcolor=ffebcd|QF
|bgcolor=yellow|SF
|A
|bgcolor=afeeee|3R
|bgcolor=ffebcd|QF
|bgcolor=yellow|SF
|bgcolor=thistle|F
|A
|bgcolor=ffebcd|QF
|bgcolor=afeeee|3R
|bgcolor=afeeee|4R
|bgcolor=ffebcd|QF
|bgcolor=afeeee|2R
|bgcolor=yellow|SF
|bgcolor=ffebcd|QF
|bgcolor=afeeee|4R
|style=color:#767676|NH
|bgcolor=afeeee|1R
|A
|
|3 / 21
|67–17
|81%
|-
|align=left|German / Madrid Open
|A
|A
|A
|A
|A
|A
|A
|bgcolor=afeeee|3R
|A
|A
|bgcolor=thistle|F
|A
|A
|A
|A
|bgcolor=afeeee|2R
|bgcolor=thistle|F
|A
|bgcolor=afeeee|2R
|A
|A
|bgcolor=afeeee|1R
|A
|A
|bgcolor=afeeee|1R
|A
|style=color:#767676|NH
|bgcolor=afeeee|1R
|A
|
|0 / 8
|11–8
|61%
|-
|align=left|Zurich / China Open
|A
|A
|A
|bgcolor=ffebcd|QF
|bgcolor=thistle|F
|bgcolor=lime|W
|A
|A
|A
|A
|bgcolor=ffebcd|QF
|A
|A
|A
|style=color:#767676|TII
|bgcolor=afeeee|2R
|A
|A
|A
|bgcolor=afeeee|2R
|bgcolor=afeeee|3R
|bgcolor=afeeee|2R
|bgcolor=afeeee|1R
|A
|A
|bgcolor=afeeee|2R
|colspan=4 style="color:#767676"|not held
|1 / 10
|15–9
|64%
|-
| colspan="33" align="left" |WTA Premier 5 / WTA 1000 tournaments
|-
|align=left|Dubai / Qatar Open
|colspan=7 style=color:#767676|not held
|colspan=3 style=color:#767676|Tier III
|colspan=4 style=color:#767676|Tier II
|bgcolor=afeeee|3R
|bgcolor=lime|W
|bgcolor=lime|W
|A
|A
|A
|bgcolor=afeeee|2R
|bgcolor=afeeee|3R
|A
|A
|A
|A
|A
|A
|A
|
|2 / 5
|13–3
|81%
|-
|align=left|Italian Open
|A
|A
|A
|A
|bgcolor=thistle|F
|bgcolor=lime|W
|bgcolor=afeeee|3R
|A
|A
|A
|A
|A
|bgcolor=yellow|SF
|A
|bgcolor=ffebcd|QF
|bgcolor=yellow|SF
|bgcolor=ffebcd|QF
|A
|bgcolor=ffebcd|QF
|bgcolor=afeeee|1R
|bgcolor=afeeee|2R
|bgcolor=afeeee|3R
|bgcolor=afeeee|2R
|bgcolor=ffebcd|QF
|bgcolor=afeeee|3R
|bgcolor=afeeee|3R
|bgcolor=afeeee|1R
|A
|A
|
|1 / 16
|34–15
|69%
|-
|align=left|Canadian Open
|A
|bgcolor=afeeee|1R
|A
|bgcolor=afeeee|1R
|A
|A
|A
|A
|A
|A
|A
|A
|A
|A
|A
|bgcolor=afeeee|2R
|A
|A
|A
|bgcolor=afeeee|1R
|bgcolor=thistle|F
|bgcolor=afeeee|1R
|bgcolor=afeeee|3R
|bgcolor=afeeee|3R
|bgcolor=afeeee|3R
|bgcolor=afeeee|1R
|style=color:#767676|NH
|A
|bgcolor=afeeee|1R
|
|0 / 11
|10–11
|50%
|-
|align=left|SoCal / Cincinnati Open
|colspan=10 style=color:#767676|Tier II
|A
|A
|A
|bgcolor=ffebcd|QF
|style=color:#767676|NH
|bgcolor=afeeee|3R
|A
|A
|bgcolor=yellow|SF
|bgcolor=afeeee|2R
|bgcolor=afeeee|1R
|bgcolor=afeeee|2R
|A
|bgcolor=afeeee|2R
|A
|bgcolor=ffebcd|QF 
|bgcolor=afeeee|1R
|A
|bgcolor=afeeee|1R
|
|0 / 9
|14–9
|61%
|-
|align=left|Tokyo / Wuhan Open
|A
|A
|A
|A
|A
|A
|A
|A
|A
|A
|bgcolor=ffebcd|QF
|A
|A
|A
|A
|bgcolor=afeeee|2R
|A
|A
|A
|bgcolor=yellow|SF
|bgcolor=afeeee|1R
|bgcolor=lime|W
|bgcolor=afeeee|3R
|A
|A
|bgcolor=afeeee|1R
|colspan=4 style="color:#767676"|not held
|1 / 7
|12–5
|72%
|-
| colspan="33" align="left" |Former Tier I tournaments
|-
|align=left|Charleston Open
|A
|A
|A
|A
|A
|A
|A
|A
|A
|A
|bgcolor=lime|W
|bgcolor=afeeee|3R
|A
|bgcolor=yellow|SF
|A
|colspan=15 style=color:#767676|Premier
|1 / 3
|10–2
|83%
|-
|align=left|Kremlin Cup
|colspan=2 style=color:#767676|not held
|style=color:#767676|TIII
|bgcolor=ffebcd|QF
|bgcolor=yellow|SF
|A
|A
|A
|bgcolor=afeeee|2R
|A
|bgcolor=ffebcd|QF
|A
|A
|A
|bgcolor=afeeee|1R
|colspan=15 style=color:#767676|Premier / not held
|0 / 5
|6–5
|55%
|-
|colspan=33 align=left|Career statistics
|-
!!!1994!!1995!!1996!!1997!!1998!!1999!!2000!!2001!!2002!!2003!!2004!!2005!!2006!!2007!!2008!!2009!!2010!!2011!!2012!!2013!!2014!!2015!!2016!!2017!!2018!!2019!!2020!!2021!!2022!!2023!!colspan=3|Career
|-bgcolor=efefef
|align=left|Tournaments
|1
|3
|5
|13
|16
|18
|10
|12
|16
|6
|16
|12
|6
|13
|14
|16
|9
|4
|10
|11
|16
|17
|16
|14
|11
|15
|8
|9
|4
|1
|colspan=3|322
|-style=font-weight:bold;background:#efefef
|style=text-align:left|Titles
|0 
|0 
|0 
|0 
|3 
|6 
|6 
|6 
|7
|1 
|2 
|2 
|0 
|3 
|3 
|2 
|2 
|0 
|1 
|0 
|1 
|3 
|1 
|0
|0
|0
|0
|0
|0
|0
|colspan=3|49
|-style=font-weight:bold;background:#efefef
|style=text-align:left|Finals
|0
|0
|0
|1
|7
|10
|7
|6
|11
|4
|4
|4
|0
|4
|3
|5
|4
|0
|1
|0
|4
|3
|2
|3
|0
|0
|0
|0
|0
|0
|colspan=3|83
|-bgcolor=efefef
|align=left|Hard W–L
|0–0
|0–2
|2–3
|14–7
|38–8
|36–7
|25–0
|32–2
|38–5
|10–2
|21–9
|20–6
|1–2
|31–5
|29–9
|21–11
|19–3
|3–1
|14–3
|13–7
|22–9
|34–9
|16–11
|26–10
|14–7
|16–11
|1–6
|2–4
|0–4
|1–1
|33 / 200
|499–164
|
|-bgcolor=efefef
|align=left|Clay W–L
|0–0
|0–0
|0–1
|2–2
|9–2
|14–2
|6–3
|5–2
|14–2
|6–2
|19–1
|10–4
|10–3
|12–5
|4–2
|11–4
|15–3
|0–0
|8–4
|3–3
|4–3
|4–3
|5–3
|6–3
|1–3
|1–2
|0–2
|0–4
|0–0
|0–0
|9 / 77
|169–68
|71%
|-bgcolor=efefef
|align=left|Grass W–L
|0–0
|0–0
|0–0
|1–2
|4–2
|4–1
|7–0
|7–0
|6–1
|6–1
|1–1
|7–0
|2–1
|7–0
|7–0
|6–1
|4–1
|5–2
|2–2
|0–0
|2–1
|3–1
|5–1
|6–1
|2–1
|2–2
|0–0
|1–1
|0–0
|0–0
|5 / 28
|97–23
|81%
|-bgcolor=efefef
|align=left|Carpet W–L
|1–1
|2–1
|0–1
|2–2
|2–1
|7–3
|3–1
|2–1 
|4–1 
|4–0 
|3–1 
|0–0 
|0–0 
|0–0 
|0–0 
|0–0
|0–0
|0–0
|0–0
|0–0
|4–1
|0–0
|0–0
|0–0
|0–0
|style=color:#767676 colspan=5|discontinued
|2 / 17
|34–14
|74%
|-style=font-weight:bold;background:#efefef
|style=text-align:left|Overall W–L
|1–1
|2–3
|2–5
|19–13
|53–13
|61–13
|41–4
|46–5
|62–9
|26–5
|44–12
|37–10
|13–6
|50–10
|40–11
|38–16
|38–7
|8–3
|24–9
|16–10
|32–14
|41–13
|26–15
|38–14
|17–11
|19–15
|1–8
|3–9
|0–4
|1–1
|49 / 322
|799–269
|75%
|-style=font-weight:bold;background:#efefef
|style=text-align:left|Win %
|50%
|40%
|29%
|69%
|80%
|82%
|91%
|90%
|87%
|84%
|79%
|79%
|68%
|83%
|78%
|70%
|84%
|73%
|73%
|62%
|72%
|76%
|63%
|73%
|61%
|56%
|11%
|27%
|0%
|50%
|colspan=3|
|-bgcolor=efefef
|align=left|Year-end ranking
|–
|204
|216
|22
|bgcolor=eee8AA|5
|bgcolor=99ccff|3
|bgcolor=99ccff|3
|bgcolor=99ccff|3
|bgcolor=thistle|2
|11
|bgcolor=eee8AA|9
|bgcolor=eee8AA|10
|48
|bgcolor=eee8AA|8
|bgcolor=eee8AA|6
|bgcolor=eee8AA|6
|bgcolor=eee8AA|5
|103
|24
|49
|19
|bgcolor=eee8AA|7
|17
|bgcolor=eee8AA|5
|40
|53
|78
|313
|1010
|
|colspan=3|{{Tooltip|$42,403,103 |Career prize money – singles and doubles combined}}
|}
</div>Notes  The WTA Tournament of Champions was held from 2009–2014 until the WTA Elite Trophy replaced it in 2015.
  In 2009, the WTA German Open was abolished and replaced by the Madrid Open.
  In 2009, the Zurich Open was downgraded to a Premier event and replaced by the China Open.
  The first Premier 5 event of the year has switched back and forth between the Dubai Tennis Championships and the Qatar Open since 2009. Dubai was classified as a Premier 5 event from 2009 to 2011 before being succeeded by Doha for the 2012–2014 period. Since 2015, it has alternated, being held in Dubai in odd years and Doha in even years.
  After 2007, the Southern California Open was downgraded and replaced in 2009 by the Cincinnati Masters.
  In 2014, the Pan Pacific Open was downgraded to a Premier event and replaced by the Wuhan Open.
  Tournament appearances include Grand Slam, WTA Tour main draw tournaments and the Summer Olympics. They do not include Fed Cup matches.
  Overall W–L include Grand Slam, WTA Tour main draw, Summer Olympics and Fed Cup matches. They do not include qualifying matches.
  1997 Zurich Open counts as 1 win, 1 loss. Venus received a walkover in the third round after Henrieta Nagyová withdrew.
  1999 US Open counts as 4 wins, 1 loss. Venus received a walkover in the second round after Anke Huber withdrew.
  2001 Indian Wells counts as 4 wins, 0 losses. Serena Williams received a walkover in the semi-finals after Venus withdrew. (Note: Venus also received a first round bye, which counts as neither a win nor a loss).
  2004 WTA German Open counts as 4 wins, 0 losses. Amélie Mauresmo received a walkover in the final after Venus withdrew. (Note: Venus also received a first round bye, which counts as neither a win nor a loss).
  2004 Pan Pacific Open counts as 1 win, 0 losses. Chanda Rubin received a walkover in the quarterfinals after Venus withdrew. (Note: Venus also received a first round bye, which counts as neither a win nor a loss).
  2011 US Open counts as 1 win, 0 losses. Sabine Lisicki received a walkover in the second round after Venus withdrew.
  2013 Miami Open counts as 1 win, 0 losses. Sloane Stephens received a walkover in the third round after Venus withdrew.(Note: Venus also received a first round bye, which counts as neither a win nor a loss).
  2015 Cincinnati Masters counts as 1 win, 0 losses. Ana Ivanovic received a walkover in the second round after Venus withdrew.

DoublesNotes  1998 Wimbledon Championships counts as neither a win or a loss. Kijimuta and Miyagi received a walkover in the first round after the Williams sisters retired. 
  1998 Kremlin Cup counts as 1 win, 0 loss. Kournikova and Seles received a walkover in the quarter-finals after the Williams sisters withdrew.
  1999 Miami Open counts as 1 win, 0 loss. Farina and Habšudová received a walkover in the third round after the Williams sisters withdrew. (Note: The Williams sisters received a bye in the first round which counts as neither a win or a loss). 
  2000 US Open counts as 4 wins, 0 loss. Black and Likhovtseva received a walkover in the semi-finals after the Williams sisters withdrew.
  2001 Wimbledon Championships counts as 2 wins, 0 loss. Navratilova and Sánchez Vicario received a walkover in the third round after the Williams sisters withdrew.
  2007 Wimbledon Championships counts as 1 win, 0 loss. Medina Garrigues and Ruano Pascuel received a walkover in the second round after the Williams sisters withdrew.
  2010 French Open counts as 5 wins, 0 loss. The Williams sisters received a walkover in the second round after Hantuchová and Wozniacki withdrew.
  2013 Fed Cup counts as neither a win or loss. Arvidsson and Larsson received a walkover after Venus and Lepchenko withdrew.
  2013 French Open counts as neither a win or loss. Kudryavtseva and Rodionova received a walkover in the first round after the Williams sisters withdrew.
  2018 Italian Open counts as 1 win, 0 loss. Atawo and Grönefeld received a walkover in the second round after Venus and Keys withdrew.

Partners

Mixed doubles

Partners

Significant finals

Grand Slam finals

Singles: 16 (7 titles, 9 runner-ups)

Doubles: 14 (14 titles)

Mixed doubles: 3 (2 titles, 1 runner-up)

Olympic finals

Singles: 1 (1 gold medal)

Doubles: 3 (3 gold medals)

Mixed Doubles: 1 (1 silver medal)

Year-end championship finals

WTA Championships

 Singles: 3 (1 title, 2 runner-ups) 

ITF Grand Slam Cup

Singles: 2 (1 title, 1 runner-up)

WTA Elite Trophy

Singles: 1 (1 title)

Tier-I / Premier-Mandatory & Premier-5 finals

Singles: 15 (9 titles, 6 runner-ups)

Doubles: 2 finals (2 titles)

WTA career finals

Singles: 83 (49 titles, 34 runner–ups)

Doubles: 23 (22 titles, 1 runner-up)

Fed Cup participation
Current through the 2020 Fed Cup Qualifying Round.

Singles (21–2)

Doubles (4–3)

Finals: 1 (1 title)

Head-to-head records

Record against top 10 players
Williams' record against players who have been ranked in the top 10. Active players are in boldface.  All statistics from the Women's Tennis Association.

 Record against No. 11–20 players 
Williams' record against players who have been ranked world No. 11–20.

 Elena Likhovtseva 9–0
 Silvia Farina Elia 9–1
 Tamarine Tanasugarn 7–0
 Alizé Cornet 7–1
 Shahar Pe'er 6–0
 Fabiola Zuluaga 6–0
 Amy Frazier 5–0
 Barbora Strýcová 5–0
 Lisa Raymond 5–1
 Meghann Shaughnessy 5–2
 Anastasia Pavlyuchenkova 4–2
 Dája Bedáňová 3–0
 Alona Bondarenko 3–0
 María José Martínez Sánchez 3–0
 Alison Riske-Amritraj 3–0
 Anna Smashnova 3–0
 Katarina Srebotnik 3–0
 Peng Shuai 3–1
 Virginie Razzano 3–1
 Karolina Šprem 3–1
 Wang Qiang 3–1
 Elena Vesnina 3–4
 Ruxandra Dragomir 3–0
 Anna-Lena Grönefeld 3–0
 Anne Kremer 3–0
 Elise Mertens 3–0
 Larisa Neiland 3–0
 Magüi Serna 3–0
 Kirsten Flipkens 3–2
 Sybille Bammer 2–0
 Mihaela Buzărnescu 2–0
 Eleni Daniilidou 2–0
 Magda Linette 2–0
 Tatiana Panova 2–0
 Magdaléna Rybáriková 2–0
 Anastasija Sevastova 2–0
 Donna Vekić 2–0
 Alisa Kleybanova 2–1
 Mirjana Lučić-Baroni 2–1
 Yayuk Basuki 1–0
 Rosalyn Fairbank 1–0
 Beatriz Haddad Maia 1–0
 Kaia Kanepi 1–0
 Ana Konjuh 1–0
 Varvara Lepchenko 1–0
 Petra Martić 1–0
 Anabel Medina Garrigues 1–0
 Kimberly Po 1–0
 Naoko Sawamatsu 1–0
 Alexandra Stevenson 1–0
 Silvija Talaja 1–0
 Yanina Wickmayer 1–0
 Sabine Appelmans 1–1
 Elena Bovina 1–1
 Nathalie Dechy 1–1
 Ágnes Szávay 1–1
 Zheng Jie 1–1
 Aravane Rezaï 1–2
 Sabine Lisicki 1–3
 Ekaterina Alexandrova 0–1
 Jennifer Brady 0–1
 Karolína Muchová 0–1
 Tatiana Golovin 0–2

* Statistics correct .

Wins over top ranked players

No. 1 wins

Top 10 wins
Williams has a  record against players who were, at the time the match was played, ranked in the top 10.

WTA Tour career earnings

*As of September 27, 2021

Longest winning streaks

35 match win streak (2000)

Double bagel matches (6–0, 6–0)

Career Grand Slam tournament seedingsBoldface' indicates tournaments won by Williams, while italics'' indicates Williams was the runner-up.

Notes

Tennis career statistics
Career statistics